Gardenia Foods (S) Pte Ltd. (also known as Gardenia Bakeries or Gardenia) is a Singaporean baked-goods company with presence in Singapore, Brunei, Indonesia, Malaysia and the Philippines. It is listed on the Singapore Exchange (SGX) via its parent company, QAF Limited, which also owns Bonjour Bakery, and are headquartered at the Chinatown Complex in South Bridge Road.

History
Gardenia was established by Horatio Sye Slocum, an American who was an employee of International Executive Service Corps and worked with bakeries based in the United States. Gardenia started out as a store bakery in Singapore, but due to demand opened a commercial bakery at Pandan Loop in March 1983. This was followed by a second bakery in June 1993.

In 2019, Gardenia stated that its products would be in compliance with the Government of Singapore ban via the Ministry of Health in accordance with the Health Promotion Board (HPB) on hydrogenated oils (PHOs), a major source of artificial trans fat. It also added that all of their products at the time were already PHO-free since the early 2000s prior to the ban, which came into effect in June 2021.

Operations in other countries

Gardenia's operations outside of Singapore is managed by separate subsidiary companies: Gardenia Bakeries (KL) Sdn Bhd (GBKL) in Malaysia, Which from 2017 has stakes that are 50 percent-owned by the Padiberas Nasional Berhad, Gardenia Bakeries Philippines, Inc. in the Philippines., and Gardenia Food Industries Sdn Bhd in Brunei.

In 2013, they also expand to Indonesia market under PT Gardenia Makmur Selaras in Bogor at St. Kapten Nangewer No.9, Nanggewer Mekar, Cibinong, Bogor, West Java 16912. According to the 2015 annual report of QAF Limited, Andree Halim is the largest shareholder in the Singapore listed bakery firm, which owns the biggest market share in packaged bread in Singapore, Indonesia, Malaysia and the Philippines. Andree is the son of the late Indonesian business tycoon Sudono Salim Liem Sioe Liong, the founder of Salim Group. Lin Kejian, meanwhile, is the son of Andree Halim, essentially the substantial owners of QAF are related to Salim Group. Indomarco Prismatama, a 40% owned unit of PT Indoritel Makmur Internasional Tbk, is the main distributor of PT Gardenia Makmur Selaras in Indonesia, which distributes the bread through Indomaret.

Gardenia Food Industries has been operating in Brunei since 1972, and is currently the country's top manufacturer and wholesale dealer of bread, buns, cakes and pastries.

Gardenia entered the Philippine market in 1997. Its main bread-manufacturing facility in the country is located in Laguna. It operates at least three other facilities: in Mabalacat (Pampanga), Cagayan de Oro and Cebu. Vitabread Food Products Inc. is responsible for the manufacturing of Gardenia products for the Luzon market.

Until late 2017, Gardenia expand its operations to the Asian market in Singapore, Brunei, Indonesia, Malaysia, the Philippines, Australia and China.

References

External links
 
 Parent website

Bakeries of Singapore
Companies listed on the Singapore Exchange
Singaporean brands